Tureia Airport is an airport on Tureia in French Polynesia .

Tureia Airport was inaugurated in 1985.

Airlines and destinations

Passenger
No scheduled flights as of May 2019.

Statistics

References

Airports in French Polynesia